Kynureninase or L-Kynurenine hydrolase (KYNU) is a PLP dependent enzyme that catalyses the cleavage of kynurenine (Kyn) into anthranilic acid (Ant). It can also act on 3-hydroxykynurenine (to produce 3-hydroxyanthranilate) and some other (3-arylcarbonyl)-alanines. Humans express one kynureninase enzyme that is encoded by the KYNU gene located on chromosome 2.

KYNU is part of the pathway for the catabolism of Trp and the biosynthesis of NAD cofactors from tryptophan (Trp).

Kynureninase catalyzes the following reaction:
  L-kynurenine + H2O ↔ anthranilate + L-alanine

Structure
Kynureninase belongs to the class V group of aspartate aminotransferase superfamily of structurally homologous pyridoxal 5'-phosphate (PLP) dependent enzymes. To date, two structures of human kynureninase have determined by X-ray diffraction with resolutions of 2.0 and 1.7 Å. Forty percent of the amino acids are arranged in an alpha helical and twelve percent are arranged in beta sheets. Docking of the kynurenine substrate into the active site suggests that Asn-333 and His-102 are involved in substrate binding.

Function
In KYNU reaction, PLP facilitates Cβ-Cγ bond cleavage. The reaction follows the same steps as the transamination reaction but does not hydrolyze the tautomerized Schiff base. The proposed reaction mechanism involves an attack of an enzyme nucleophile on the carbonyl carbon (Cγ) of the tautomerized 3hKyn-PLP Schiff base. This is followed by Cβ-Cγ bond cleavage to generate an acyl-enzyme intermediate together with a tautomerized Ala-PLP adduct. Hydrolysis of the acyl-enzyme then yields 3hAnt.

References

Further reading

External links 
 PDBe-KB provides an overview of all the structure information available in the PDB for Human Kynureninase

EC 3.7.1